They Were Sisters is a 1945 British melodrama film directed by Arthur Crabtree for Gainsborough Pictures and starring James Mason and Phyllis Calvert. The film was produced by Harold Huth, with cinematography from Jack Cox and screenplay by Roland Pertwee.  They Were Sisters is noted for its frank, unsparing depiction of marital abuse at a time when the subject was rarely discussed openly. It was one of the Gainsborough melodramas.

Background
Unlike most of the hugely successful melodramas made by Gainsborough during the mid-1940s, They Were Sisters has a near-contemporary rather than a costume setting, spanning the years from the end of the First World War, to the late 1930s. The screenplay was developed by Pertwee from a popular novel of the same name by Dorothy Whipple, published in 1943.

They Were Sisters features the spouses of both Mason and Calvert; Pamela Mason (billed under her maiden name Pamela Kellino and playing Mason's daughter, despite being only seven years younger) and Peter Murray-Hill. Mason later admitted that he acted most of his bullying, sadistic role with a permanent hangover as a result of his using drinking as a means of dealing with the frustration he felt from his role and the British film industry in general.

Plot
The film focuses on the lives of three sisters; Lucy (Phyllis Calvert), Vera (Anne Crawford) and Charlotte (Dulcie Gray). It opens at a dance in 1919, establishing their personalities and following them through courtship and marriage. While the sisters remain close to one another, their characters and paths through life are very different.

Lucy is the most stable, sensible, practical and in a happy marriage, whose greatest sadness is her inability to have children, which she sublimates by lavishing affection on her nephews and nieces. Vera is married with a child but the relationship is humdrum and loveless and she is restless and bored, indulging her appetite for adventure and excitement through a series of flirtations, which sometimes go beyond the bounds of the socially acceptable. Charlotte is a cowed drudge, suffering emotional abuse at the hands of her manipulative, brutal husband Geoffrey (James Mason), who belittles and humiliates her in front of their three children.

The film shifts between the three households but its main focus is the way in which Lucy and Vera have to look on, unable to provide effective help despite their best attempts, as Charlotte's treatment by her husband (who, it is strongly implied, is also engaging in an unhealthy relationship with their elder daughter) becomes ever more shocking and she descends into alcoholism to blur her despair. A final attempt by Charlotte to flee Geoffrey ends in tragedy. Vera's marriage, too, crumbles as her husband discovers her in a serious extra-marital relationship and petitions for divorce. The film ends by showing Charlotte's and Vera's children being cared for by the childless Lucy.

Cast

 James Mason as Geoffrey Lee
 Phyllis Calvert as Lucy Moore
 Dulcie Gray as Charlotte Lee
 Anne Crawford as Vera Sargeant
 Hugh Sinclair as Terry Crawford
 Peter Murray-Hill as William Moore
 Barry Livesey as Brian Sargeant
 Pamela Kellino as Margaret Lee
 Ann Stephens as Judith Lee
 Brian Nissen as John Watson
 David Horne as Mr. Field

 Joss Ambler as Blakemore
 Roland Pertwee as Sir Hamish Nair
 Amy Veness as Mrs. Pursley
 Thorley Walters as Channing
 John Gilpin as Stephen Lee
 Brefni O'Rorke as Coroner 
 Helen Stephens as Sarah Sargeant
 Roy Russell as Lethbridge
 Edie Martin as Cook
 Dora Sevening as 	Janet
 Helen Goss as Webster

Reception

The film was very popular at the British box office, being one of the biggest hits of the year. According to Kinematograph Weekly the 'biggest winners' at the box office in 1945 Britain were The Seventh Veil, with "runners up" being (in release order), Madonna of the Seven Moons, Old Acquaintance, Frenchman's Creek, Mrs Parkington, Arsenic and Old Lace, Meet Me in St Louis, A Song to Remember, Since You Went Away, Here Come the Waves, Tonight and Every Night, Hollywood Canteen, They Were Sisters, The Princess and the Pirate, The Adventures of Susan, National Velvet, Mrs Skefflington, I Live in Grosvenor Square, Nob Hill, Perfect Strangers, Valley of Decision, Conflict and Duffy's Tavern. British "runners up" were They Were Sisters, I Live in Grosvenor Square, Perfect Strangers, Madonna of the Seven Moons, Waterloo Road, Blithe Spirit, The Way to the Stars, I'll Be Your Sweetheart, Dead of Night, Waltz Time and Henry V.

Critical
The Times wrote, "the merit of this long and intelligent film lies in the skill with which it establishes the personalities of the sisters...the acting throughout has strength and sincerity."

References

External links 
 
 
 
Review of film at Variety

1945 films
1945 drama films
British drama films
Gainsborough Pictures films
British black-and-white films
Films directed by Arthur Crabtree
Films based on British novels
Films set in England
Films set in 1919
Islington Studios films
Melodrama films
1940s English-language films
1940s British films